Frederick West "Fred" McCarren (April 12, 1951 – July 2, 2006) was an American television and film actor. He gained recognition for his roles on the television series Amanda's (1983) and Hill Street Blues (1984).

Life and career
McCarren was born on April 12, 1951 in Butler, Pennsylvania. He graduated from Butler Senior High School where he starred in several plays. After attending the University of Cincinnati and Point Park College, he left for a different kind of campus – Ringling Bros. and Barnum & Bailey Clown College in Venice, Florida – and instead of joining the circus afterward, he headed for New York City where he immediately found work in TV commercials.

A subsequent career in film and television followed soon thereafter from the late 1970s throughout the 1980s. He starred opposite Bea Arthur on the short-lived 1983 sitcom Amanda's and he later made guest appearances on television shows such as Scarecrow and Mrs. King, Hill Street Blues, Remington Steele and The Golden Girls.

McCarren married Lisa Hogan on December 30, 1982.  After several years of living in Tarzana, California, the couple moved back to his native Pennsylvania in 1989 where they focused on raising their six children. He continued to work in both radio and television commercials and his voice was heard as the crazy Dr. Sanchez in radio spots for the Mad Mex restaurant chain, and he was seen as the coach in a series of TV commercials for Dick's Sporting Goods, as well as TV spots for PNC, PPG, Comcast and Builder's Surplus.

Death
Fred McCarren died on July 2, 2006 at the age of 55 from colon cancer at Butler Memorial Hospital in Butler, Pennsylvania. He is survived by his wife, Lisa, four sons and two daughters.

Filmography

References

External links

1951 births
2006 deaths
American male television actors
American male film actors
20th-century American male actors
Male actors from Pennsylvania
People from Butler, Pennsylvania
Deaths from cancer in Pennsylvania
University of Cincinnati alumni
Point Park University alumni